In the Doghouse is a 1962 British comedy film directed by Darcy Conyers and starring Leslie Phillips and Peggy Cummins. Shot in black-and-white, the film was based on the bestselling novel It's a Vet's Life by Alex Duncan.

The title refers to the British expression of a person being "in the doghouse" when a person is ostracised usually relating to a husband for domestic bad behaviour, and usually used in the third person e.g. "he is in the doghouse because... "

Plot
Jimmy Fox-Upton (Leslie Philips) is an accident prone and less than brilliant veterinary student in his final year of college having already failed his finals 4 times. He unexpectedly passes and his good heart outweighs any academic shortcomings.

He takes over an old practice and becomes rivals with a fellow student who opens a very swanky practice around the corner. Jimmy keeps a chimpanzee in the surgery.

The overarching plot revolves around trying to prevent a consignment of horses being sent to France as meat by a Mr Peddle aided by Skeffington.

Near the end of the film a lion escapes into a crowded pet show filled with a variety of both pets and people.

The three main heroes try to sabotage the shipment of horses but end up tied in the back of the lorry with the horses. The chimpanzee unties them.

They then chase Peddle and Skeffington on the rescued horses. This gets in the newspapers.

The vet is then called to Buckingham Palace to treat the corgis.

Cast
 Leslie Phillips as Jimmy Fox-Upton
 Peggy Cummins as Sally Huxley
 Hattie Jacques as Josephine Gudgeon
 James Booth as Bob Skeffington
 Dick Bentley as Mr. Peddle
 Colin Gordon as Dean
 Joan Heal as Mrs. Peddle
 Esma Cannon as Mrs. Raikes
 Fenella Fielding as Miss Fordyce
 Richard Goolden as Mr. Ribart
 Joan Hickson as Miss Gibbs
 Vida Hope as Mrs. Crabtree
 Jacqueline Jones as Rita
 Peggy Thorpe-Bates as Mrs. Muswell
 Harry Locke as Sid West
 Patsy Rowlands as Barmaid
 Kynaston Reeves as Colonel
 Joan Young as Middle-Aged Woman
 Judith Furse as Massage Woman
 Lance Percival as the policeman (uncredited)
 George A. Cooper examiner

Critical reception
The Radio Times wrote "...makes a fine comic vehicle for Leslie Phillips, who has to resort to his trademark charm to atone for his misadventures as he begins life as a qualified vet (after spending years trying to pass his final exams. However, he also gets to reveal an unexpected action-man side as he thwarts a horse-smuggling ring. ... Despite booming support from Hattie Jacques, this patchy film is perhaps most significant for bringing down the curtain on the career of Peggy Cummins, who made her first film in 1940 at the age of 15."

References

External links
In the Doghouse at IMDb
In the Doghouse at BFI

1962 films
1962 comedy films
British comedy films
1960s English-language films
1960s British films